Shur Su (also Romanized as Shūr Sū) is a village in Shirin Su Rural District, Maneh District, Maneh and Samalqan County, North Khorasan Province, Iran. At the 2006 census, its population was 399, in 69 families.

References 

Populated places in Maneh and Samalqan County